V Rising is an upcoming survival game developed and published by Stunlock Studios. First announced on May 5, 2021, for Windows, it entered early access on May 17, 2022. Within a week, it had surpassed one million sales.

Gameplay
V Rising is a settlement building and survival game set in an open world. The player acts as a newly resurrected vampire. The player gathers materials in order to craft more advanced materials and items, in order to build a personal castle. They then must defeat enemies to unlock new abilities and technologies. The blood level of the vampire must also be maintained, by feeding on victims.

Development 
Stunlock Studios is developing V Rising with the support of the Unity game engine.

Reception
IGNs early access review found that the crafting aspects of the game were time-consuming, but that the boss design and action role-playing combat were excellent.

Sales
Following its early access, V Rising sold over 500,000 copies in the first three days,1 million copies after the first week, and 1.5 million after the second. By January 2023, the game had sold three million copies.

References

External links
 

Upcoming video games
Windows games
Survival video games
Open-world video games
Action role-playing video games
Single-player video games
Multiplayer video games
Early access video games
Video games developed in Sweden